Sokolovka is a rural locality (a village) and the administrative centre of Sokolovsky Selsoviet, Davlekanovsky District, Bashkortostan, Russia. The population was 514 as of 2010. There are 4 streets.

Geography 
Sokolovka is located 8 km southeast of Davlekanovo (the district's administrative centre) by road. Novosharipovo is the nearest rural locality.

References 

Rural localities in Davlekanovsky District